Guðmundur Benediktsson nicknamed Gummi Ben (born 3 September 1974) is an Icelandic TV personality, sports commentator and former footballer and manager.

Playing career
At a young age, Guðmundur attracted the attention of major foreign clubs. At 15, he was approached by teams such as Arsenal, Everton, Tottenham and Stuttgart. Later, while still 15, he ruptured his anterior cruciate ligament. After the injury, he was offered the choice of going to Stuttgart or Germinal Ekeren, opting for the latter because he believed he would get more playing time.

In 1997, he went on trial at Preston North End (which at the time was managed by David Moyes) and was offered a one-month contract which would be renewed on a monthly basis (due to Guðmundur's record of injury problems). Guðmundur rejected the deal, as he had a newborn (his son Albert) and needed more long-term security.

After a stint at Geel in 2000, Guðmundur had serious knee problems, leading him to play irregularly for KR in the subsequent years. In one season during the 2000-2004 period, he was assistant coach at KR when Willum Þór Þórsson coached the team.

He retired from playing 2009 and he started a career as a football manager.

National team career
He made his debut for Iceland in 1994 against the United Arab Emirates, and scored in the game. His final game for Iceland came in January 2001 against Chile.

TV career
Guðmundur has commentated matches live for Icelandic television and was the commentator for Iceland's matches at UEFA Euro 2016. His enthusiastic commentary earned him international praise. One especially memorable commentary came immediately after full-time of Iceland's 2–1 win over England in the round of 16 (English translation given here):This is done! This is done! We are never going home! Did you see that? Amazing! I can't believe it! This is a dream. Never wake me from this amazing dream! Live the way you want, England! Iceland is going to play France on Sunday. France Iceland! You can go home. You can go out of Europe. You can go wherever you want. England 1 Iceland 2 is the closing score here in Nice. And the fairytale continues.

Personal life
His son Albert Guðmundsson is currently with AZ Alkmaar and is a full international.

References

1974 births
Living people
Gudmundur Benediktsson
Gudmundur Benediktsson
Expatriate footballers in Belgium
Gudmundur Benediktsson
Gudmundur Benediktsson
Association football forwards
Gudmundur Benediktsson
Gudmundur Benediktsson
Úrvalsdeild karla (football) managers